Trivisa is a 2016 Hong Kong action crime thriller film produced by Johnnie To and Yau Nai-hoi, featuring the directorial debuts of newcomers Frank Hui, Jevons Au and Vicky Wong. The film is a fictionalized story about three real-life notorious Hong Kong mobsters, Yip Kai Foon and Cheung Tze-keung, who are portrayed in the film by Gordon Lam, Richie Jen and Jordan Chan respectively. The film had its world premiere at the 66th Berlin International Film Festival's Forum section. The film also opened the 40th Hong Kong International Film Festival on 21 March 2016 and was theatrically released in Hong Kong on 7 April 2016.

In Buddhist teaching, Trivisa is the Sanskrit term for the three poisons (or the three unwholesome roots)—greed, anger and delusion—that give rise to suffering.

Plot
In early 1997, mobsters Kwai Ching-hung, Yip Kwok-foon and Cheuk Tze-keung, who have never met one another, are all in Hong Kong. Thereafter, rumour has it that Hong Kong's three most notorious mobsters, known in the underworld as the "Three Kings of Thieves", are plotting together to score a final hit before the transfer of sovereignty of Hong Kong. However, none are initially aware of the rumour.

The flamboyant Cheuk is a successful kidnapper who extorts money from the rich, despite the police surveilling him. Upon hearing of the rumour, Cheuk decides to seek out Yip and Kwai to fulfil his need for a greater thrill. Cheuk sets up a hotline and offers money for those who can help him find Yip and Kwai.

In the past, Yip was a powerful and prestigious robber, but a gunfight with the Royal Hong Kong Police prompts him to flee to China, where he changes his trade to smuggling counterfeit electronics. Although successful in his business, he becomes increasingly angry due to the need to grovel to corrupt Chinese officials. Upon hearing of the rumour, Yip considers abandoning his business and picking up his gun again. After a series of humiliations, Yip decides to call Cheuk.

The cautious Kwai uses several pseudonyms to hide his identity. His expertise is in small-scale robberies, which pose minimal risk but also bring little profits. He previously killed three Hong Kong police officers when they identified him, then hid overseas for some time. He returns to Hong Kong with two mainland Chinese gangsters to rob a jewelry store. To scope out the jewelry store, Kwai goes to stay at the nearby apartment of Fai, a friend and former gang member who, with a wife and young daughter, has since gone straight. Kwai tells Fai that he sells phones, but then uses Fai's daughter to avoid suspicion while obtaining guns. Kwai hears of the rumour, but initially restrains himself from contacting Cheuk. When Kwai abandons the heist at the last minute, the gangsters do not want to return to China empty-handed, and volunteer to join Kwai in grander exploits. Kwai pretends to pay off the pair, then stabs them to death. When Fai discovers Kwai's true motives, he begs Kwai to stop endangering his family. Kwai replies that he will leave the next day, and decides to call Cheuk.

Ultimately, all three come to a sticky end. When Yip calls Cheuk at night, a local resident is disturbed and calls the Hong Kong police. Yip's fellow smugglers pose as confused mainland Chinese tourists, successfully fooling the police into letting them go. When one policeman off-handedly insults the smugglers, Yip snaps. He follows the policemen and shoots them with his AK-47, in full view of other police at a cafe. Those officers shoot Yip, who apparently dies crawling towards his AK-47.

When Kwai calls Cheuk at night, Kwai is led to brag about his exploits to confirm his identity. Fai, who was unaware of how successful Kwai's robberies were, awakens and overhears this. When Kwai suspects that Fai overheard, Kwai opens the family's bedroom door with knife in hand, while Fai pretends to sleep. Kwai ultimately does not act against Fai and his family. When Kwai awakens, he finds that a police SWAT team is converging on the apartment, while Fai and his family have already fled.

Cheuk is tricked into meeting Yip's former associate, now an arms dealer, having been told Yip would be present. At the meeting, Cheuk is contacted by both Yip and Kwai. The arms dealer attempts to kidnap Cheuk for a ransom, but Cheuk dispatches him and escapes with a truck full of dynamite to use in a grand scheme with Yip and Kwai. However, Cheuk hits a motorcyclist, crashing the truck. As Cheuk is piling the spilt dynamite back onto the truck, the police arrive and Cheuk surrenders.

The movie finally reveals, in flashback, that Cheuk, Yip and Kwai once came across each other at the same restaurant in 1997, unaware of each others' identities. The film closes on footage of the 1997 Hong Kong handover ceremony.

Cast

Gordon Lam as Kwai Ching-hung (based on )
Richie Jen as Yip Kwok-foon (based on Yip Kai-foon)
Jordan Chan as Cheuk Tze-keung (based on Cheung Tze-keung)
Tommy Wong as The Fence
Elliot Ngok as Ho Yu-kei
Stephen Au as Inspector Wu
Lam Suet as Boss Fong
Wan Yeung-ming as Old Dog
Philip Keung as Fai
Frankie Ng as Ting
Lau Ka-yung as Master Sai
Hung Yan-yan as Kwan-sai
To Yin-gor as Commander
Zhang Kai as Hong Qi
Le Zi-long as Wong Lei
Thimjapo Chattida as Noon
Aoi Ma as Bo
Kam Loi-kwan as Kam
Huang Kai-sen as Chung
Jimmy Wong as Fisherman
Ben Yuen as Chief Chen
Yan Zi-fei as Chief Chen's mistress
Law Chi-sing as Gui
Ho Ka-wah as Guang
Hui Ping-hang as Chief Long
Li Ying-to as Chief Song
Leung Kin-ping as Manager Fok
Chiu Chi-shing as Condor
Lee Man-piu as Lung
Keung Kam-shan as Policewoman
Keung Kam-kui as Policeman
Wong Wai-tong as Policeman
Law Tsin-wong as News reporter
Yu Tat-chi as Cheng Kin-kuen
Yang Yu-fei as Customs officer
Hu Bin-hui as Comrade
Flora Cheung as Informer
Lam Ka-shing as Customers officer
Wong Gar-ling as Informer
Jamie Lee as Informer
Chow Pok-fu as Informer
Yan Ngai-to as Informer
Wong Che-keuong as Informer
Ng Kwok-ming as Informer
Cheung Pet-wu as Informer
Yeung Sai-ho as Policeman
Ursula Lin as Waitress
Kwok Yuk-keung as Policeman
Ho Ka-fai as Informer
Daniel Kwok
Skyline Leung

Reception

Box office
The film grossed HK$3,392,095 during its first three days of release in Hong Kong and opening at No. 3 during its debut weekend. By the end of its fifth week, the film has grossed about HK$9,180,000.

Critical reception
Clarence Tsui of The Hollywood Reporter gave the film a positive praising the performances of Richie Jen and Gordon Lam, the editing by Allen Leung and David Richardson and calls it "an impressive calling card signalling brighter cinematic futures." Fionnuala Halligan of Screen Daily praised the film's set design and editing and believes the film will "clearly attract festival interest.". Edmond Lee of the South China Morning Post rated film a score of 4/5 stars and praises the film's bold vision and how newcomer directors Frank Hui, Jevons Au and Vicky Wong "couldn't have made a stronger start to their fledgling careers."

Controversy
Trivisa was banned in China. When it won the Hong Kong Film Award for Best Film in 2017, the broadcast was blacked out on Mainland TVs.

In late 2015, Cheung Wai-chuen, owner of a film properties company, and Law Yun-lam, a logistics firm employee, were arrested for possession of counterfeit money that was used in Trivisa without the proper permits for storage and transportation, which the film's producers were responsible for securing. Despite being marked as props, the judge felt that the fake money looked too real: saying "Nobody could rule out the risk of people stealing these fakes and using them as real money." Cheung and Law were sentenced to four months in prison by a Hong Kong district court in May 2018, a sentence that was suspended for two years. The Federation of Hong Kong Filmmakers condemned the case stating "This is against the industry's dedication to professionalism in filmmaking. The authorities' took on a case that case was unjust. Members of the Hong Kong film industry are not only disappointed and furious, it also sends shivers down our spines." Some film industry members suspected the case was influenced by Mainland China.

Awards and nominations

See also
Johnnie To filmography

References

External links
 
 

2016 films
2016 action thriller films
2016 crime thriller films
Hong Kong action thriller films
Hong Kong crime thriller films
Hong Kong heist films
Hong Kong gangster films
2010s Cantonese-language films
Media Asia films
Milkyway Image films
Films set in 1997
Films set in Hong Kong
Films shot in Hong Kong
2016 directorial debut films
Film controversies in China
2010s Hong Kong films